Wells Airport  is a privately owned, public-use airport located in Courtland Township three miles (5 km) northeast of the central business district of Rockford, in Kent County, Michigan, United States.

Facilities and aircraft 
For the 12-month period ending December 31, 2004, the airport had 1,076 general aviation aircraft operations, an average of 90 per month.

References

External links 

Airports in Michigan
Transportation buildings and structures in Kent County, Michigan